The 2011–12 women's national hockey team represents the United States in various tournaments during the season. The team will attempt to win the gold medal at the Women's World Championships in Burlington, Vermont. The head coach of the National team is Mark Johnson.

Senior team

2011 IIHF Eight Nations Tournament

Schedule

IIHF Worlds
In preparation for the 2012 IIHF Women's World Championship, the National Team played Canada in Ottawa, Ontario on March 31.

Exhibition

Schedule

Roster

Under 18 team

Exhibition
From August 18 to 21, the Under 18 team will compete versus Canada in a three game series at the Canadian International Hockey Academy in Rockland, Ontario.

References

External links
 Women's Hockey pages on Hockey Federation website

United States women's national ice hockey team
2011–12 in American women's ice hockey by team